Sultan Aslambekovich Sosnaliyev (23 April 1942 – 23 November 2008) was a Soviet Army officer of Circassian ethnicity who served as a commander of Abkhaz and North Caucasian forces during the War in Abkhazia and as the defence minister of Abkhazia in 1993–1996 and 2005–2007.

Early life

Sultan Sosnaliyev was born in Baksan in Kabardino-Balkaria, Russia, to Kabardin parents. He graduated from the Syzran Higher Military Aviation School and from the Zhukov Air and Space Defense Academy and served in the Soviet anti-aircraft forces for 29 years. He retired in 1990 in the rank of a colonel and worked in Kabardino-Balkaria's construction industry till 1992.

Role in the War in Abkhazia

Sosnaliyev became the head of the military department of the newly formed Confederation of Mountain Peoples of the Caucasus. After the beginning of the War in Abkhazia he arrived to Abkhazia with the group of Kabardin volunteers through on 15 August 1992. He was appointed the head of the staff of the Gudauta-based State Committee of the Defence and was one of the planners of the victorious Battle of Gagra.

He was appointed the minister of defence in April 1993 and later awarded the rank of Major General. Sosnaliyev and Sergei Dbar planned the July and September Sukhumi offensives. On 24–25 March 1994 Sosnaliyev was in charge of the last operation of the war – capture of the village of Lata in the Kodori Valley.

Post-war life

Sosnaliyev resigned in July 1996 and returned to Kabardino-Balkaria. After Sergei Bagapsh had been elected the President of Abkhazia he offered the office of the minister of defence to Sosnaliyev as "reforms were desperately needed" in the Abkhazian army. The latter agreed and served in the Abkhazian government as a minister of defence and a vice-premier till May 2007.

Honours and awards
Order of the Red Banner
Title Honoured Military Pilot of the USSR
Title "Hero of Abkhazia"
Order "Honor and Glory" (Abkhazia)

References

Sources
Полководец Султан Сосналиев, Commander Sultan Sosnaliyev from the official site of the President of Abkhazia

1942 births
2008 deaths
People from Baksan
Vice Premiers of Abkhazia
Abkhazian military personnel
Ministers for Defence of Abkhazia
Soviet Air Defence Force officers
Syzran Higher Military Aviation School alumni
Zhukov Air and Space Defence Academy alumni
North Caucasian independence activists